The 1932 College Football All-America team is composed of college football players who were selected as All-Americans by various organizations and writers that chose College Football All-America Teams in 1932. The eight selectors recognized by the NCAA as "official" for the 1932 season are (1) Collier's Weekly, as selected by Grantland Rice, (2) the Associated Press, (3) the United Press, (4) the All-America Board, (5) the Football Writers Association of America (FWAA); (6) the International News Service (INS), (7) Liberty magazine, and (8) the Newspaper Enterprise Association (NEA).

Consensus All-Americans
For the year 1932, the NCAA recognizes eight published All-American teams as "official" designations for purposes of its consensus determinations. The following chart identifies the NCAA-recognized consensus All-Americans and displays which first-team designations they received.

All-American selections for 1932

Ends
Paul Moss, Purdue (AP-1; UP-1; CO-1; AAB-1; NEA-1; INS-1; CP-1; NYS-1; NYT-1; WC-1; FWAA; LIB; TR-1; PD; PM)
Joe Skladany, Pittsburgh (College Football Hall of Fame) (AP-2; UP-1; NEA-1; INS-1; CP-2; FWAA; TR-1)
Ted Petoskey, Michigan (UP-3; WC-1; AAB-1; INS-3; NYS-2)
Jose Martinez-Zorilla, Cornell (AP-1)
David Ariail, Auburn (NEA-2; CP-1)
 Richard T. King, Army (AP-2; UP-3; NEA-2; INS-2; NYS-1)
Dave Nisbet, Washington (AP-3; CO-1; INS-2; LIB)
Clary Anderson, Colgate (NEA-3; NYT-1)
Frank Meadow, Brown (AP-3)
Edwin Kosky, Notre Dame (UP-2)
Virgil Rayburn, Tennessee (NYS-2)
Red Matal, Columbia (UP-2; NEA-3; PM)
Francis "Hands" Slavich, Santa Clara (INS-3)
Sid Gillman, Ohio State (PD)
Ivy Williamson, Michigan (CP-2)
Ford Palmer, USC (CP-3)
Madison Pruitt, TCU (CP-3)

Tackles
Joe Kurth, Notre Dame (AP-1; UP-1; CO-1; AAB-1; NEA-1; INS-1; CP-1; NYS-1; NYT-1; WC-1; FWAA; LIB; TR-1; PM)
Ernie Smith, USC (College Football Hall of Fame) (AP-1; UP-1; CO-1; AAB-1; NEA-1; INS-1; CP-1; NYS-2; NYT-1; WC-1; FWAA; LIB; TR-1; PD)
Edward Krause, Notre Dame (AP-2; UP-3; NEA-2; INS-2; CP-2)
Fred Crawford, Duke (College Football Hall of Fame) (AP-2; UP-2; CP-3)
Raymond Brown, USC (AP-3; UP-3; NEA-2; INS-2; CP-3; NYS-1; PM)
Howard Colehower, Penn (AP-3; UP-2; NEA-3; INS-3; CP-2)
L. Brown, Brown (NEA-3)
Ted Rosequist, Ohio State (INS-3)
John Wilbur, Yale (NYS-2)
Irad Hardy, Harvard (PD)

Guards
Milton Summerfelt, Army (AP-1; UP-1; CO-1; NEA-1; INS-1; CP-1; NYS-1; FWAA; NYT-1; TR-1; PD; PM)
Bill Corbus, Stanford (College Football Hall of Fame) (AP-3; UP-1; CO-1; AAB-1; NEA-1; CP-2; NYS-1; WC-1; TR-1)
Robert Smith, Colgate (AP-2; UP-2; AAB-1; NEA-2; INS-1; CP-1; NYS-2; WC-1; LIB; PD)
Aaron Rosenberg, USC (College Football Hall of Fame) (UP-3; INS-2; FWAA; LIB)
Johnny Vaught, TCU (College Football Hall of Fame) (AP-1; UP-2; INS-3; CP-3; NYT-1)
Joseph Gailus, Ohio State (AP-2; UP-3; NEA-2; INS-2; CP-3; NYS-2; PM)
Mike Steponovich, St. Mary's (AP-3; NEA-3)
James Harris, Notre Dame (NEA-3)
Greg Kabat, Wisconsin (INS-3)
Thomas Hupke, Alabama (CP-2)

Centers
Clarence Gracey, Vanderbilt (AP-2; UP-1; NEA-2; INS-2; NYS-2; NYT-1; TR-1, CP-3; LIB; PD)
Lawrence Ely, Nebraska (AP-1; UP-2; CO-1; INS-3; NYS-1)
Chuck Bernard, Michigan (AP-3; NEA-1; INS-1; CP-2; FWAA)
Cap Oehler, Purdue (NEA-3)
Tom Gilbane, Brown (CP-1)
Art Krueger, Marquette (WC-1; PM; AAB-1)
Joe Tormey, Pitt (UP-3)

Quarterbacks
Harry Newman, Michigan (College Football Hall of Fame) (AP-1; UP-1; CO-1; AAB-1; NEA-1; INS-1; CP-1; NYS-1; NYT-1; WC-1; FWAA; LIB; TR-1; PD; PM)
Cliff Montgomery, Columbia (AP-2; UP-3; INS-2; NYS-2)
Felix Vidal, Army (AP-3)
Bob Monnett, Michigan State (NEA-2)
Johnny Cain, Alabama (College Football Hall of Fame) (NEA-3)
Robert Ramsay Chase, Brown (INS-3; CP-2; NYS-1 [fb])
Charles R. Soleau, Colgate (UP-2)
William "Bill" Beasley, St. Mary's (CP-3)

Halfbacks
Warren Heller, Pittsburgh (AP-1; UP-1; CO-1 [fb]; AAB-1; NEA-1; INS-1; CP-1; NYS-1; WC-1; FWAA; LIB; TR-1; PM)
Jimmy Hitchcock, Auburn (College Football Hall of Fame) (AP-1; UP-2; CO-1; AAB-1; NEA-1; INS-1; CP-2; NYS-2; NYT-1; WC-1; FWAA; TR-1; PD; PM)
Don Zimmerman, Tulane (AP-1 [fb]; UP-1; CO-1; NEA-3; INS-2; CP-1; LIB; NYT-1)
Harrison Stafford, Texas (College Football Hall of Fame) (AP-2)
George Sanders, Washington State (AP-2; UP-3; NEA-2; NYS-2)
Beattie Feathers, Tennessee (College Football Hall of Fame) (AP-3; UP-3; INS-3)
John Crickard, Harvard (AP-3)
Gil Berry, Illinois (NEA-2; CP-3)
Frank Christensen, Utah (NEA-3)
Johnny Cain, Alabama (College Football Hall of Fame) (INS-2)
Whitey Ask, Colgate (INS-3)
Robert Lassiter, Yale (PD)
Bohn Hilliard, Texas (CP-2)
Henry "Hank" Schaldach, California (CP-3)

Fullbacks
Roy Horstmann, Purdue (UP-2; AAB-1; NEA-1; INS-1; CP-2; NYS-1 [hb]; NYT-1; WC-1; TR-1; PM)
Frank Christensen, Utah (UP-1; CP-3)
George Melinkovich, Notre Dame (UP-2 [halfback]; NEA-2; INS-2; LIB; PD)
Jack Manders, Minnesota (CP-1; INS-3)
Bart Viviano, Cornell (AP-2; NYS-2)
Duane Purvis, Purdue (AP-3)
Angelo Brovelli, St. Mary's (UP-3; NEA-3; FWAA)

Key
 Bold – Consensus All-American
 -1 – First-team selection
 -2 – Second-team selection
 -3 – Third-team selection

Official selectors
 AAB = All America Board selected by Christy Walsh in collaboration with Glenn Warner, W.A. Alexander, Jesse C. Harper, Edward L. Casey
 AP = Associated Press
 CO = Collier's Weekly, selected by Grantland Rice
 INS = INS (Hearst) newspaper syndicate
 LIB = Liberty magazine
 NANA = North American Newspaper Alliance
 NEA = NEA Sports Syndicate
 UP = United Press

Other selectors
 CP = Central Press Association, the captains' poll
 NYS = New York Sun
 WC = Walter Camp Football Foundation
FWAA = Football Writers Association of America
 NYW = New York World-Telegram
 TR = Ted A. Ramsay, an attempt to create a consensus All-American team using the selections of the six most prominent selectors: the All-America Board, NEA, UP, AP, New York Sun and New York World. Three players, Moss, Kurth and Newman were unanimously selected by all six.
 PD = Parke H. Davis
 PM = Philip Martin

See also
 1932 All-Big Six Conference football team
 1932 All-Big Ten Conference football team
 1932 All-Pacific Coast Conference football team
 1930 All-Southern football team
 1932 All-Southwest Conference football team

References

All-America Team
College Football All-America Teams